Dominek is a non-operational PKP railway station in Dominek (Pomeranian Voivodeship), Poland.

Lines crossing the station

References 
Dominek article at Polish Stations Database , URL accessed at 21 March 2006

Railway stations in Pomeranian Voivodeship
Disused railway stations in Pomeranian Voivodeship
Słupsk County